"Fight the Blues" is Hikaru Utada's second Japanese digital single and 29th single overall. It was released on March 27, 2008, as a promotional single for her fifth Japanese studio album. "Fight the Blues" was tied-in as the CM song for the program 報道特集NEXT (News Report NEXT) for her Heart Station album. This digital single reached number one in virtually every online music store in Japan prior to the Heart Station album's release, including the most used store in Japan, iTunes Japan, as well as OnGen, among others.

Track list

Chart rankings

References

2008 singles
Hikaru Utada songs
Songs about depression
Billboard Japan Hot 100 number-one singles
Songs written by Hikaru Utada
2008 songs